Ram Diwali is a locality in Faisalabad District, Punjab, Pakistan. It comprises four villages which are locally identified as Chak No. 112 JB, Chak No. 2 JB, Chak No. 3 JB and Chak No. 4 JB. Prior to the Partition of British India in August 1947, the predominantly Muslim locality was also inhabited by Sikhs, who migrated to Amritsar after the creation of Pakistan. Other ethnic Punjabi Jat clans, namely the Gill and Sandhu, are also settled in Ram Diwali.

Notable people 

 Arfa Karim (1995–2012) was an international student prodigy and record-holding youngest Microsoft Certified Professional who hailed from the village of Chak No. 4 JB in Ram Diwali.

References

Villages in Faisalabad District